The 2015 NCAA Division I Football Championship Game was a postseason college football game that determined a national champion in the NCAA Division I Football Championship Subdivision for the 2014 season. It was played at Toyota Stadium in Frisco, Texas, on January 10, 2015, with kickoff at 1:00 p.m. EST, and was the culminating game of the 2014 FCS Playoffs. With sponsorship by Northwestern Mutual, the game was officially known as the NCAA FCS Championship presented by Northwestern Mutual.

Teams
The participants of the 2015 NCAA Division I Football Championship Game were the finalists of the 2014 FCS Playoffs, which began with a 24-team bracket. No. 2 seed North Dakota State and No. 5 seed Illinois State qualified for the final by winning their semifinal games.

North Dakota State Bison

Led by first-year head coach Chris Klieman, the Bison finished the regular season 11–1, 7–1 in MVFC play, to earn a conference co-championship (shared with Illinois State) and the No. 2 seed in the FCS Playoffs. North Dakota State defeated unseeded South Dakota State, No. 7 seed Coastal Carolina, and unseeded Sam Houston State to reach the final. The Bison entered the Championship game with a 3–0 record in previous FCS Championships, having won the last three straight.

Illinois State Redbirds

Led by sixth-year head coach Brock Spack, the Redbirds finished the regular season 10–1, 7–1 in MVFC play, to earn a conference co-championship (shared with North Dakota State) and the No. 5 seed in the FCS Playoffs. Illinois State defeated unseeded Northern Iowa, No. 4 seed Eastern Washington, and No. 1 seed New Hampshire to reach their first-ever final.

Game summary

Scoring summary

Game statistics

References

External links
Box score at ESPN
2014 FCS Championship North Dakota State vs Illinois State via YouTube

2014 NCAA Division I FCS football season
NCAA Division I Football Championship Games
Illinois State Redbirds football games
North Dakota State Bison football games
American football in the Dallas–Fort Worth metroplex
Sports in Frisco, Texas
NCAA Division I FCS Football Championship Game
NCAA Division I FCS Football Championship Game